Lanphear is both a surname and a given name. Notable people with the name include:

 Dan Lanphear (1938–2018), American football player
 Kate Lanphear, American magazine editor
 Lanphear Buck (1901–1974), American field hockey player